Johann Benjamin Koppe (19 August 1750 in Danzig – 12 February 1791 in Hanover) was a German Lutheran theologian. He originated the "fragment 
hypothesis" (1783) in response to the Synoptic problem.

He studied at the universities of Leipzig and Göttingen, where in 1775 he became a professor of theology. In 1784 he relocated to Gotha as a senior pastor, upper consistory and general superintendent, then in 1788 moved to Hanover as first court chaplain at the Schlosskirche, consistory and general superintendent for the Grafschaft Hoya.

Published works 
 Pindari Carmina et fragmenta : cum lectionis varietate et annotationibus, (3 volumes); with Christian Gottlob Heyne and Gottfried Hermann, edition of Pindar, (Greek and Latin; Latin prose version by Koppe. Volume 3 by Gottfried Hermann ..."Commentatio de metris Pindari. Scholia"). Publisher: Oxonii : R. Bliss, 1807-1809.
 D. Robert Lowth's Lord Bischofs zu London ... Jesaias : neu übersetzt nebst einer Einleitung und critischen philologischen und erläuternden Anmerkungen, 1779–1781; (German translation of Robert Lowth by Georg Hermann Richerz with additions and comments by Koppe).
 Christliches Gesangbuch, 1789 – Christian hymnbook.
 Novum Testamentum Graece : perpetua annotatione illustratum, (10 volumes); continued after Koppe's death by Johann Heinrich Heinrichs, Christoph Friedrich von Ammon and Thomas Christian Tychsen, 1809–1828.
 "Notes on the epistle to the Romans; intended to assist students of theology, and others, who read the scriptures in the originals" by Samuel Hulbeart Turner, 1824; translated from the Latin of Johann Benjamin Koppe.

References

German Lutheran theologians
1750 births
1791 deaths
Clergy from Gdańsk
Academic staff of the University of Göttingen
18th-century German Protestant theologians
German male non-fiction writers
18th-century German male writers